The Lamandau Nature Reserve is found in Borneo, Indonesia. It is home to a number of Bornean orangutans (Pongo pygmaeus). It is this reserve that rehabilitates and orphan orangutans are released into by the Orangutan Foundation. (McConkey, 2005)

The number of endangered orangutans is currently around 500, but that number is gradually growing as the Lamandau Nature Reserve implements a program of rehabilitation and release of orangutans into the natural environment.

See also
Lamandau River

Further reading
McConkey, M. 2005. Bornean Orangutan, In Caldecotte, J. and Miles., eds, World Atlas of Great Apes and their conservation. Prepared at the UNEP World Conservation Monitoring Centre. University of California Press, Berkeley, USA.

References

Protected areas of Indonesia
Borneo